Rangkasbitung (colloquially called Rangkas) is a town which is the administrative centre of Lebak Regency, in Banten Province of Java, Indonesia. It had a population of 134,945 at the 2020 Census, while the official estimate as at mid 2021 was 137,041.

It is the site of the Multatuli Museum, a history museum which opened in 2018.

Climate
Rangkasbitung has a tropical rainforest climate (Af) with heavy rainfall year-round.

Transportation

The town lies on the road connecting Jakarta, Serpong and Pandeglang. It is also connected with western railway line of Java, connecting Jakarta with Serang until Merak. The town is served by Jakarta Metrorail.

Notable residents

Eduard Douwes Dekker or Multatuli, the author of Max Havelaar, once lived and worked in the town. His experience and observation during his time here triggered him to write the famous romance.

Eugenia van Beers, the mother of American rock musicians Eddie van Halen and Alex van Halen was born in this town.

References

Lebak Regency
Districts of Banten
Regency seats of Banten
Populated places in Banten